Arbab Jehangir Khan Khalil (late) (1 August 1936 – 16 October 2007) regarded as chief of the Khalil tribe, was a Pakistani politician hailed from Khyber-Pakhtunkhwa, Pakistan. He served as the 8th elected (14th overall) Chief Minister from 7 April 1985 to 29 May 1988 and then as the Leader of opposition in the Khyber-Pakhtunkhwa assembly from 1989 to 1990. He also served as Federal Minister for Petroleum Resources for 27 days from awami national party, Housing and Works, Narcotics control and Senior Minister of Khyber-Pakhtunkhwa was in pakistan peoples party.

Early life and education 
He was born at the home of Nawab Arbab Sher Ali Khan at Tehkal in Peshawar. He was serving as a secretary to governor arbab sikander khan He got a degree in law from University of Peshawar.

Political career 
Arbab Jehangir started his political career in 1969. In 1977, he contested election for his first time and was elected to National Assembly from Pakistan Muslim league. A lawyer by profession, he earned the distinction of being electorally undefeated in every election in which he contested in his 32-year political career. He was retired from politics prior to the 2002 general elections. He held senior positions in all Pakistan's major political parties including Pakistan Muslim League, Awami National Party and Pakistan People's Party.

Death 
Arabab Jehangir Khan died due to cardiac arrest on Tuesday, 16 October 2007 at the age of 71. He was laid to rest in his family graveyard in Tehkal area of Peshawar.

See also 

 List of Chief Minister of Khyber Pakhtunkhwa
 Khyber Pakhtunkhwa

References

External links 
 Khyber-Pakhtunkhwa Provincial Government

1936 births
2007 deaths
Chief Ministers of Khyber Pakhtunkhwa
Pashtun people
Jehangir Khan
North-West Frontier Province MPAs 1985–1988